Vedrijan is a village in the Municipality of Brda in the Littoral region of Slovenia.

The parish church is dedicated to Saint Vitus and belongs to the Koper Diocese.

References

External links

Vedrijan on Geopedia

Populated places in the Municipality of Brda